Deutsche Schule Quito (CAQ) is a German international school in Quito, Ecuador. It serves levels Kindergarten through the final year of senior high school (Bachillerato/Sekundarstufe II - Deutsches Abitur).

See also
 German School of Guayaquil

References

External links
  Colegio Alemán Quito
  Deutsche Schule Quito

Secondary schools in Quito
International schools in Quito
Quito